Elizabeth Brooke may refer to:

 Elizabeth Brooke (1503–1560), alleged mistress of Henry VIII and estranged wife of the poet Thomas Wyatt
 Elizabeth Brooke (writer) (1601–1683), English religious writer
 Elizabeth Brooke (1562–1597), wife of Robert Cecil, 1st Earl of Salisbury
 Elizabeth Brooke, Marchioness of Northampton (1526–1565), sister-in-law of Queen Catherine Parr and close friend of Elizabeth I

See also
 Elizabeth Brooke Schrader or Libbie Schrader (born 1979), American singer-songwriter
 Elizabeth Brooks (disambiguation)